Seryl-tRNA synthetase, mitochondrial is an enzyme that in humans is encoded by the SARS2 gene.

References

Further reading